is a Japanese manga series written by Kyōichi Nanatsuki and illustrated by Yang Kyung-il. It was serialized in Shogakukan's Weekly Shōnen Sunday magazine from March 2012 to January 2016. Shogakukan collected the chapters in fourteen  tankōbon volumes.

Publication
Area D''' is written by Kyōichi Nanatsuki and illustrated by Yang Kyung-il. It was serialized in Shogakukan's Weekly Shōnen Sunday from March 14, 2012, to January 20, 2016. Shogakukan collected its chapters in fourteen tankōbon volumes, released from August 17, 2012, to February 18, 2016.

The manga has been licensed in France by Pika Édition, in Italy by J-POP and in Spain by Norma Editorial.

Volume list

See alsoProject ARMS, another manga series written by Nanatsuki.Tantei Xeno to Nanatsu no Satsujin Misshitsu'', another manga series written by Nanatsuki.

References

External links
Area D at Web Sunday 

Action anime and manga
Prisons in anime and manga
Shogakukan manga
Shōnen manga
Survival anime and manga